Sandvik Coromant is a Swedish company that supplies cutting tools and services to the metal cutting industry.

Sandvik Coromant is headquartered in Sandviken, Sweden and is represented in more than 150 countries with some 7900 employees worldwide. It is part of the business area Sandvik Machining Solutions within the global industrial group Sandvik.

Metalworking focus 

Sandvik Coromant produces an extensive range of metal cutting tools:
Turning, including general turning, heavy turning, small part machining, parting and grooving, hard part turning and threading.
Milling, including face milling, shoulder milling, profile milling, turn milling, high feed milling, chamfering, slot milling and thread milling.
Drilling, including general drilling, step and chamfer drilling, composite drilling and tapping.
Boring, including rough boring, fine boring and reaming.
Tool holding, including tools for turning centres and lathe tools, machining centres, multi-task machines and sliding head machines.
Digital machining, including advanced software and tools that support digital manufacturing, from design and planning to machining and machining analysis.

History in brief 

1942: The company began as a small production unit for cemented carbide tools in Sandviken, Sweden when Wilhelm Haglund is assigned the job as manager of the unit. However, in 1951, new innovations and manufacturing methods lead to the establishment of a more industrialized unit in Gimo, Sweden.

1957: Scrapers become the first product with mechanically clamped “indexable inserts” or “throw-away inserts”. The birth of the T-Max holder and use of indexable inserts is the start of a big change in the practice and productivity in machining.

1969: Heat-resistant Gamma Coating, or GC, is introduced as a grade, revolutionizing turning, milling, and drilling with previously unmatched metal cutting performance.

1972: The Multi-Service marketing campaign sees the light of day, and the yellow coat becomes an important symbol. Tool-pool, machine-adapted tool recommendations and mini-catalogues are made available.

1990: Coromant Capto, a single holding system for both rotating and stationary spindles, is introduced. This ground-breaking invention provided a new and efficient means of combining and organizing tooling, while reducing tool-changing time in machinery. Today Coromant Capto (Latin for “I am gripping”) is an established system and an ISO standard around the world.

1997: Sandvik Coromant offers to repurchase used cemented carbide inserts for recycling, underlining the company's commitment to environmental responsibility.

2008: Sandvik Coromant acquires Norwegian anti-vibration tool developer Teeness. The unique Silent Tools damping adaptors allow for increased cutting parameters and a more secure, vibration-free process.

2013: Sandvik Coromant researchers discover that it is possible to control coating crystals at an atomic level to create uniform, tightly-packed, thermal-protected coating for new levels of hardness: Inveio coating technology is introduced.

2016: CoroPlus makes its first appearance, used in the design, planning, monitoring of machining performance and the optimization of machining processes.

2017: PrimeTurning is introduced, a new methodology enabling turning in all directions.

2019: The production unit in Gimo, Sweden, is officially announced as a "lighthouse" by World Economic Forum as a role model in industry 4.0.

Research and development 

Sandvik Coromant employs 500 researchers working at research and development centers around the globe. In total, some 60 research and testing facilities work in close cooperation with machine tool manufacturers, machining tool agents, and customers across a wide range of industries.

Training and education 
Training

More than 20 Sandvik Coromant centers worldwide offer customers, distributors, employees and students theory-based training courses, seminars, and live demonstrations. Among its e-learning courses Sandvik Coromant offers Metalcutting Technology Training; some 35,000 users are registered for the program.

Education
Part of the organization's mission is the continued advancement of industry knowledge and education, Sandvik Coromant is involved with several educational facilities and organizations across the globe.

 Sandvik AB founded the technical upper secondary school Gӧranssonska Skolan in Sandviken, Sweden in 2002 to provide students with the technical competences needed to bridge the skills gap the manufacturing industry is facing.
 Wilhelm Haglund's Gymnasium is a joint project between Sandvik AB and Östhammar Municipality, founded in 2007. It is a technical upper secondary school in Gimo, Sweden, which provides students with three years of technical education in preparation for workforce entry.
 In 2008, the Sandvik Coromant Center for Machinist Technology opened at the Northern Alberta Institute of Technology. This facility increased the school's capacity for training machinist apprentices.
 Sandvik Coromant is also engaged in various R&D projects at the Chalmers University of Technology Materials and Manufacturing Technology and Applied Mechanics.

Partnerships

Sandvik Coromant is a member of the Advanced Manufacturing Research Centre (AMRC) in the UK, working with the centre's partners: Boeing, Rolls-Royce and the University of Sheffield. The AMRC shares research and support in areas of assembly, composite materials, structural testing, and advanced machining for the aerospace industry.

Sandvik Coromant has also partnered with the Commonwealth Center for Advanced Manufacturing as one of its originating industry members, as well as the Connecticut Center for Advanced Technology in the United States and the Manufacturing Technology Center in the UK.

See also 

 SAF 2507

References 

Companies based in Gävleborg County
Tool manufacturing companies of Sweden
Mining equipment companies
Steel companies of Sweden